Dr. Abdul Majeed Abdul Bari was the Minister of Islamic Affairs of the Maldives from 2008 to 2012.

References

Year of birth missing
20th-century births
2018 deaths
Government ministers of the Maldives